The Yakovlev AIR-7 was a prototype Soviet high performance light aircraft of the 1930s. It was a two-seat single-engined monoplane, which demonstrated excellent performance during testing. After the prototype almost crashed as a result of flutter, its designer, Alexander Sergeyevich Yakovlev suffered temporary disgrace and no production followed.

Design and development
In April 1931, Alexander Sergeyevich Yakovlev, freshly graduated from the air force academy, was assigned as an engineering supervisor to State Aviation Factory No 39 (GAZ-39) where the designer Nikolai Nikolaevich Polikarpov worked as an NKVD prisoner. (While the factory included an "Internal Prison" which housed Polikarpov and many other designers, Yakovlev was a normal employee at the factory and not a prisoner). GAZ-39 specialised in production of Polikarpov's I-5 fighter, a biplane powered by a license-built Bristol Jupiter engine and Yakovlev realised that a monoplane light aircraft designed around the Jupiter engine of the I-5 and carefully streamlined could reach a higher speed than the I-5 while carrying a passenger.

Despite disapproval from the management of GAZ-39, Yakovlev received funding from Osoaviakhim, the Soviet paramilitary sports society, and assembled a small team within the factory to design and build the new aircraft, the AIR-7.

The resulting aircraft was a carefully streamlined two-seat tractor low-wing monoplane of mixed construction. Its fuselage was built of welded mild steel tubing, with dural panelling forward of the cockpit and fabric covering aft, and accommodated the pilot and passenger in tandem under an enclosed canopy. The wood and fabric wing was braced with cables and overwing steel struts to the fuselage, enabling a thinner wing to be used. The aircraft was fitted with a fixed conventional landing gear, with the mainwheels enclosed in trouser fairings to reduce drag, with a sprung metal tailskid. Powerplant was a single Shvetsov M-22, a license-built Bristol Jupiter radial engine enclosed by a Townend ring, driving a two-bladed propeller.

Operational history
The AIR-7 made its maiden flight on 19 November 1932. On 23 November, the AIR-7 was being demonstrated in front of senior officers of the Soviet Air Forces when its starboard aileron broke off in flight, apparently the result of flutter, and the test pilot made a forced landing. Yakovlev took responsibility for the accident, stating that an error had been made in calculating the strength of the aileron hinge. The commission investigating the accident, which refused to listen to any evidence from Yakovlev, concluded that Yakovlev should be prohibited from carrying out design work and should not receive an award for which he had been recommended. He and his team were sacked from OKB-39. Yakovlev eventually used his connections in the Communist Party to gain permission to restart aircraft design work, setting up what became the Yakovlev OKB in a derelict Moscow bed factory in 1934.

The AIR-7 was repaired after the accident, fitted with strengthened aileron hinges and modified undercarriage fairings.

Specifications

Notes

Citations

References

 Gordon, Yefim, Dmitry Komissarov and Sergey Komissarov. OKB Yakovlev: A History of the Design Bureau and its Aircraft. Hinkley, UK: Midland Publishing, 2005. .
 Gunston, Bill.  The Osprey Encyclopedia of Russian Aircraft 1975–1995. London, UK: Osprey, 1995. .
 Gunston, Bill and Yefim Gordon. Yakovlev Aircraft since 1924. London, UK: Putnam Aeronautical Books, 1997. .

External links

Yakovlev Design Bureau: Early Aircraft: AIR-7

1930s Soviet sport aircraft
AIR-7
Single-engined tractor aircraft
Low-wing aircraft
Aircraft first flown in 1932
Conventional landing gear